Oscar J. Dahlene (April 24, 1886 – October 22, 1949) was an American college football player and coach.  He was the eighth president of Pritchett College in Glasgow, Missouri, serving from 1917 until 1920. He died in 1949 in Alabama.

Playing career
Dahlene joined the football program his junior year at the University of Kansas as a placekicker and fullback under head coach A. R. Kennedy.

The 1908 Kansas Jayhawks were the undisputed Missouri Valley Conference champion and finished with a record of 9–0.  As a kicker, he was the only player to score in the first half of the Nebraska game in 1908, scoring 16 points.  Kansas won the game by a score of 20–15, thus making Dahlene's 16 points critical to their undefeated 9–0 season and conference title.

In 1909 Kansas went 8–1, starting the season with eight straight wins, and the program did not repeat until the 2007 season.

Coaching career
After graduation from the University of Kansas, Dahlene was named the fourth head football coach at Ottawa University in Ottawa, Kansas and he held that position for the 1910 season.  His coaching record at Ottawa was 2–3–1.
  His 1910 teams was outscored by one point: 30 to 29.

Dahlene's first game as a head coach was against his former mentor, A. R. Kennedy.

Season results

References

External links
 

1886 births
1949 deaths
American football fullbacks
Heads of universities and colleges in the United States
Kansas Jayhawks football players
Ottawa Braves football coaches
20th-century American academics